Zandvoort aan Zee is a terminal train station in the town of Zandvoort, Netherlands. The station opened on 3 June 1881, and is within walking distance of the beach. The station is on the Haarlem–Zandvoort railway. The station has 2 platforms and services are operated by Nederlandse Spoorwegen. Until 1995 trains from Maastricht and Heerlen terminated at this station.

Train services
As of 9 December 2018, the following services call at Zandvoort aan Zee:

National rail

Bus services

Railway stations in North Holland
Railway stations opened in 1881
Zandvoort
1881 establishments in the Netherlands
Railway stations in the Netherlands opened in the 19th century